Karl Lang can refer to:

Karl Heinrich Lang (1764 – 1835), German historian
Karl Georg Herman Lang (1901 – 1976), Swedish zoologist